Cyril Desbruslais  (b. 21 December 1940, Calcutta) is an Indian Jesuit priest, Professor of Philosophy at Jnana-Deepa Vidyapeeth, Pune, India, and a playwright.

Family background and early life

He was born in Calcutta, Bengal Presidency, British India, on 21 December 1940. He was born to Cyril and Maisie Desbruslais. He has a sister named after his mother. Another sister, Marina, was born two years later. She died of tuberculosis at the age of eighteen months. Says Desbruslais, "She has always been my little baby intercessor in heaven. Mum and Dad died, also of TB, in the early 1950s (it was a fatal illness, in those days). We were brought up by a very loving uncle (my Mum's brother)." Desbruslais was schooled at first in Calcutta with the Jesuits (St Xavier's), then with the Irish Christian brothers (in a boarding school, Asansol) and he enjoyed his five years with them. He did his Bachelor of Commerce at St Xavier's College (Calcutta) and worked for a year at Remington Rand of India, then joined the Society of Jesus. He had a Jesuit uncle, Vernon Desbruslais. He had been considering being a priest, but this idea he used to brush aside. But from 1962 he decided to give it a try. He has influenced young people such as Shashi Tharoor, former Minister of External Affairs, and General Shankar Roychowdhury, former Chief of the Army Staff.

Searching in Service and Unity 
He started a youth group, "Searching in Service and Unity", (SSU) in 1971, when he was beginning his theology studies at De Nobili College, Pune, India. He wanted to support young people, to hold inter-faith celebrations and develop young people's charitable impulses.

Liberation theology
As Gustavo Gutiérrez had put it, liberation theology is not a mere re-hashing of the old doctrinal theses with a new emphases, as in Jürgen Moltmann's Theology of Hope, for instance. Rather, liberation theology is a radically new hermeneutic – "a theologising from the underside of the boot." If other contemporary Western theologians, like Karl Rahner, Edward Schillebeeckx and Avery Dulles weren't exactly wearing the oppressor's boot that trod down the poor, they certainly did not share the situation of the oppressed. Now it is oppressed people ("under the boot") who are enunciating a theology, from their oppressed perspective. And that is a totally new way of looking at things. And wasn't the Bible addressed primarily to them?
But, one might ask, "Could such uneducated, illiterate and dehumanised people theologise at all?"   Desbruslais devoured the latters volumes and was convinced.

Around about this time (1975), an International Synod of Bishops, inspired by Medellin, spoke of the inseparable link between authentic faith and action for justice. General Congregation XXXII of the Society of Jesus put it more forcefully when it spoke of the "inseparable link" between faith formation and building up God's kingdom (action for justice, again). And then there was Fr Pedro Arrupe SJ, the man who helped put the Society of Jesus back on its radical path again. He was convinced that this was the way to live out the Christian, Jesuit way of life in today's world.

But,  it took inspiration from the Bible and was inspired by the mission of Moses, the Old Testament prophets and finally, the greatest and most striking prophet of them all, Jesus - a man, THE man, more than a man. But India is 98.5% non-Christian, so liberation theology would be able to galvanise, at most a minute 1 1/2% of our people for faith-inspired action for justice. What about the others? One could, of course, try to elaborate a separate liberation theology for Hindus, based on the Gita (as some Indian freedom fighters had done, during the struggle for Independence - or other Hindu Holy Books), a liberation theology for Muslims, based on the Koran (as Ashgar Ali Engineer and some brave young radicals in Iran are doing) ... but that would only divide us up again! What we need is united action for justice and liberation by ALL Indians, inspired with a common vision. And this common vision could NOT be the Holy Book of one religion, but a shared understanding of the human person. However,  After all, the colonials had fallen into the rut of peddling the dominant qualities of their oppressive group as THE human characteristics: adult, male, white, Christian (and they had scant respect for people or cultures which were not distinguished by these attributes).

Yet,  So he dialogued with people (common people, youth of all religions and their families, from his youth group, and all over the country and abroad, not forgetting to talk over controversial issues with academics and University professors, too). 

Based on this dialogues and taking a phrase from the medieval Francisco Suárez SJ:  "common human nature, adequately understood",  he thoughtfully formulated an understanding of the four essential conditions of being human: 1. Embodiedness, 2. Social Dimension, 3. Rootedness in the world and 4. Capacity for Transcendence (the ability to go beyond the space-time boundaries). 

Thus it is not absolutely necessary to believe in God or be religious to be human; but as long as you are spiritual and open to transcendence, you are living fully your humanity.

 written by him and enacted by youngsters of all creeds and communities for over 40 years, mainly in Pune. Some have been adapted and staged in Mumbai, Hyderabad and other parts of the world.
And the work still goes on.

Books

Plays
Desbruslais has written and directed yearly plays with relevant social themes since 1972. With more than 25 stage plays on themes as diverse as nuclear disarmament, globalisation, terrorism, capitalism and consumerism and religious dogma to his credit, Desbruslais believes that theatre enlightens and changes mindsets, attitudes and prejudices. "Through the messages embedded in our plays, SSU is promoting out-of-the-box thinking among the young and is abating — if not removing — hatred that's making us all such violent beings," he says. Some of his plays are:
 The Impossible Dream (1972) 
 Pilgrim of the Future (1973)
 Eschaton (1974) 
 No plays(1974 - 1977)
 The Promised Land (1978)
 Boy and Girl (1978) 
 Two By Two (1979)
 No. No, Jeremiah (1981) 
 The Prince of Whales (1983) 
 Dateline Jerusalem (1987) 
 Inigo (1990)
 Even to the Indies (1993)
 Pedro (1995)
 Camillo (1997)
 The Ballad of Nestor and Cecy (1997) 
 Excelsior (2000) 
 Carry on Boy and Girl (2002)
 Boy and Girl Forever (2004) 
 It's Great to Be Young (2006) 
 Change your Habit (2008) 
 Against the Tide (2010)
 The White Rose (2012)
 A. T. (2014)
 Adam and Eve (2015)
 Esperanza (2016)
 Roses in the Sea (2017)
 Giddyap Gideon (2018)
 Two By Two (2019: Revised, repeat performance!)

References

1940 births
Living people
20th-century Indian Jesuits
20th-century Indian philosophers
21st-century Indian philosophers
Indian male dramatists and playwrights
Philosophers of religion
Writers from West Bengal
21st-century Indian Jesuits
Jesuits
philosophers